A pedelec (from pedal electric cycle) or EPAC (electronically power assisted cycle), is a type of low-powered electric bicycle where the rider's pedalling is assisted by a small electric motor. However, unlike some other types of e-bikes, pedelecs are classified as conventional bicycles in many countries by road authorities rather than as a type of electric moped. Pedelecs include an electronic controller which cuts power to the motor when the rider is not pedalling or when a certain speed – usually  or  – is reached.  Pedelecs are useful for people who ride in hilly areas or in strong headwinds. While a pedelec can be any type of bicycle, a pedelec city bike is very common. A conventional bicycle can be converted to a pedelec with the addition of the necessary parts, e.g., motor, battery, etc.

Many jurisdictions classify pedelecs as bicycles as opposed to mopeds or motorcycles. More powerful e-bikes, such as the S-Pedelecs and power-on-demand e-bikes (those whose motors can provide assistance regardless of whether the rider is pedalling) are often classified as mopeds or even motorcycles with the rider thus subject to the regulations of such motor vehicles, e.g., having a license and a vehicle registration, wearing a helmet, etc.

Advantages and disadvantages 
Pedelecs provide various advantages over conventional bicycles:
 Mobility: People in hilly areas can cycle using a pedelec rather than having to rely on fully motorised transport (e.g., cars or motorbikes). This is particularly useful to the elderly who may no longer have the capacity for the strenuous effort that climbing demands.
 Speed: Distances can be covered more quickly, as the average speed is greater while the effort can remain the same. 
 Effort: Alternatively, the same speeds can be reached with less effort. This means that a cyclist on a pedelec may avoid undue perspiration – particularly when going uphill or against the wind – so bicycle commuting in work clothes is less problematic, e.g., eliminating the need to change and/or shower upon getting to work.
 Greater range: As the cyclist is less fatigued, and average speeds higher, greater distances become feasible. Users of pedelecs ride more often and longer distances with the same effort.

The main disadvantage of the pedelec is its price, which is significantly higher than that of similar, but conventional bicycles. The other additional expenses are minor: these are the electricity recharging costs and the eventual replacement of the battery, which together have been calculated to cost a mere €0.20–0.40 (US$0.22–0.45; GB£0.17–0.34) per 100 km. Other disadvantages are higher risk of theft due to its higher value, and the pedelec's higher weight caused by the battery, motor and sturdier frame.

History 
In 1989, Michael Kutter, founder of Dolphin E-bikes, designed and produced the first pedelec prototype. The first market-ready models of this kind were available in 1992 from the Swiss company Velocity under the name Dolphin.

In 1994, larger numbers were produced by Yamaha under the name Power Assist.

In 1995, the first Flyer in the same year founded the Swiss start-up company BKTech AG in small series by e-business (as an integral part of the start-up) to the market.

Pedelec market penetration

Europe 
Throughout the whole of Europe in 2011, between 900,000 and 1.24 million units were sold.

Germany 
 there were about 600,000 pedelecs on the road in Germany. Growth has been spectacular: the year before, 310,000–340,000 pedelecs were sold in Germany and this in turn was 55% more than in 2010. In fact, in Germany sales have gone up by more than 30% every year since 2008. In comparison, there were around 70 million conventional bicycles in Germany in 2011 according to ZIV, the German Bicycle Industry Association.

About 95% of all e-bikes in Germany are in fact pedelecs.

ADAC, the German automotive club, tested a large number of pedelecs in 2013, where about 56% of the pedelecs failed the test with a score lower than reasonable due to unsatisfactory safety and durability.

Elsewhere
Only the Chinese market for pedelecs and e-bikes is bigger than the European. According to the National Bureau of Statistics in China, more than 100 million e-bikes are on the road. Annual production in Chinese factories has increased from 58,000 in 1998 to 33 million in 2011. A pedelec classification separate from an e-bike is not known in China.

Legal status of pedelecs worldwide
To really be useful, it is important for a pedelec to be legally classified as a bicycle in each country or jurisdiction rather than classified as a moped or motorcycle. Otherwise, if a pedelec is classified as a moped or motorbike then it may not be allowed in bike lanes or on bike paths; the pedelec may have to be registered; the rider may have to wear a motorcycle helmet; and/or vehicle insurance may have to be paid for.

Europe 
In the European Union a pedelec does not need registration, insurance, or license plate, if it adheres to these rules:
 Motor power up to 250 W (continuous)
 Motor is active only when the pedals are turned 
 Highest speed of 25 km/h (15.5 mph) with motor assistance

If any of these rules is not followed, the vehicle is classified as either e-bike or S-Pedelec which require a license plate and insurance, or as a motorbike which also requires a driving license.

Austria 
Under Austrian law is no difference between any types of electric bicycles like such as exclusively powered by electricity without having pedals (see below, lit. d) or as hybrid powered (see below, lit. b), equal if it is power-assisted only when pedalling (pedelec but not: S-Pedelec) or without need of pedalling (commonly in Austria known as e-bike).

To be such electric vehicles not classified as motor vehicle but as Fahrrad (= bicycle) according to § 2 paragraph 1 number 22 lit. b and d Road Traffic Act 1960 (StVO 1960) in conjunction with § 1 paragraph 2a Motor Vehicle Law 1967 (KFG 1967) two types of electric bikes can be distinguished:

The above named § 1 paragraph 2a KFG 1967 defines as follows:

As for normal (only muscle powered) bikes, also for electric bikes, the provisions of bicycle Regulation, for the control of these are the same as those for muscle StVO-powered bicycles, etc. Mandatory use of the bike path lane with bicycles. For their (commercial) In placing on the market subject to the product liability provisions.

If the above criteria are exceeded, the electric bicycle (equal if a so-called S-Pedelec or any other e-bike) it is a motor vehicle under the rules of the KFG 1967 and not a "Fahrrad" under the StVO 1960 and is only allowed to drive as a moped with the corresponding consequences. It must be a liability insurance be completed, it is the helmet and a driver's license of the corresponding class L1-eB (Vehicle classification "Two-wheel moped" in the Regulation (EU) No 168/2013) must be present. It must also be equipped like a moped with a maximum design vehicle speed less or equal 45 km/h. For these, the buyer should make sure to receive a COC (certificate of conformity) from the dealer in addition to the purchase contract. Only with these documents, the fast e-bike can be registered.

Other of above described electric bicycles are not typable in Austria.

The Netherlands 
The true Pedelecs are not required to have any other prerequisities than a bicycle has.

However, any pedelec where the power assistance is triggered by merely turning wheels rather than pedal motion (a large number of cheap versions or notoriously front hub assistance), are required to have a licence plate for a scooter / small motorcycle (so called snorfiets or bromfiets), a valid driving licence and an insurance.

In case of the power assistance stopping at a speed up to 25 km/h, the riders are not required to carry motorcycle helmets, however, this speed limit shall not be exceeded even while pedaling only. There is no speedlimit by law for human powered vehicles, including un-assisted pedelecs at > 25 kmh speed.
Electric bicycles, for example Specialized Turbo, without 25 km/h speed limitation for power assistance are considered a small motorcycle and besides license plate (yellow with black letters), driving license and insurance, a 'motorcycle helmet' must be worn at all time from the start of 2017 and onwards.

Very surprisingly, a large fleet of electric bicycles and pedelecs without required power control linked to the pedaling effort can be seen on the cycling paths without any proper registration.
Additionally, many users found very simple ways how to tweak their pedelecs in order to overcome the pedaling sensor, making their pedelecs without further proper vehicle registration illegal.

Asia

Hong Kong 

Pedelecs, and all kinds of mechanical assist, are regarded as "motor vehicles" and classified as motor cycles, making legal registration impossible. The Hong Kong Transport Department is currently conducting a review, with a first report expected in mid-2020.

Singapore 

Pedelecs are allowed, when wearing a helmet, the motor output is limited to 200W and the motor cuts out by 25 km/h.

India 

Electric vehicles with a motor having power less than 250W, and a maximum speed 25 km/h or lower, are not required to be registered under the Central Motor Vehicle Rules, and may be driven freely without any license/paperwork.

Japan
Electric-assisted bicycles are treated as human-powered bicycles, while bicycles capable of propulsion by electric power alone face additional registration and regulatory requirements as mopeds. Requirements include electric power generation by a motor that cannot be easily modified, along with a power assist mechanism that operates safely and smoothly. In December 2008, the assist ratio was updated as follows:
 Under 10 km/h; 2
 10–24 km/h; 2 - (speed in km/h - 10) / 7
 Over 24 km/h; 0

In October 2017, only for the special case that 3 wheel bicycle that draws a cart with a device to be drawn, the ratio was updated as follows:

 Under 10 km/h; 3
 10–24 km/h; 2 - 3 * (speed in km/h - 10) / 14
 Over 24 km/h; 0

(See Moped)

Australia 
As of 30 May 2012, Australia has an additional new electric bicycle category using the European model of a "Pedelec" as per EN15194 Standard. This means the bicycle can have a motor of 250 watts continuous rated power which must be activated only by pedalling (if above 6 km/h) and must cut out over 25 km/h. The State of Victoria is the first to amend their local road rules to accommodate this new standard as of 18 September 2012.

Technical

Components 
Pedelecs differ from an ordinary bicycle by an additional electric motor, a battery, an electronic control system for the motor as well as a sensor to detect the motion of the cranks. Most models are also equipped with a battery charge indicator and a motor power setting, either continuously or divided into support levels.

Battery 
Besides the motor, the battery is the main component of pedelec technology. It is usually either a NiMH - Ni - or a lithium-ion battery. The battery capacity is up to 24 Ah at 24 or 36 V or up to 15 amp hours at 48 V. The stored energy can be up to about 800 watt hour n (Wh), but mostly about 400 Wh (2013). In ideal conditions, after a thousand charges NiCd batteries have 85% of their original capacity and are therefore considered worn. With NiMH batteries about 400 to 800 cycles are possible. The charging time depending on the type of battery is around 2 to 9 hours. The durability of the battery is dependent on other factors. As lead-acid batteries discharge they provide less power, so that full motor power is no longer achieved. The very light, more expensive lithium ion batteries are now used by most manufacturers and have a range of up to 100 kilometers with moderate pedaling and a medium capacity battery (e.g. 15 Ah). Lithium batteries do not tolerate frost and should not be charged at frosty temperatures. For safety, the chemical composition and the quality of the electronics are crucial. Especially with short circuit and over voltage, lithium-ion batteries react very strongly. These problems in laptops have led to recalls. Lithium iron phosphate (LFP) batteries are a notable exception. They have far safer thermal characteristics as well as being non-toxic.

In evaluating pedelec batteries, it is useful to consider not only the capacity, but also criteria such as durability, memory effect, charging time, weight, safety and environmental protection.

Manufacturers which equip their pedelecs with NiCd batteries usually deliver them with an AC adapter that discharges the battery completely before the actual charging process in order to decrease the memory effect. NiMH batteries have a much lower memory effect. With lithium-ion batteries there is no memory effect.

A lithium iron phosphate battery is much longer-lived than a lithium-ion battery. Its use significantly reduces operating costs resulting from battery wear. In 2013, they are not yet available as standard in most pedelec models, but some pedelecs (e.g. Beyond Oil) have begun installing LFP batteries as standard.

Motor control 
For switching or control of the motor, there are several possibilities:
 Measuring the force or torque from the signal of a force sensor on the pedals, the pedal crank, the chain or at the wheel
 Measurement of treading on the signal from a revolution counter or threshold switches on the crank, or at another suitable location
 Measurement of both force and the speed
 Measurement of acceleration or drawbar force at the push trailer
 Measuring electrical values in the serial hybrid (pedal generator)

In addition, the speed of the vehicle are measured on the wheel, in particular, for example, to drive the motor from 25 km/h off.

The measurement can be further processed mechanically or electronically and is used to control the motor on and off or to regulate a control function based on continuously.

The fed power is based on the sensor data (force sensor, crank speed, ground speed) is calculated based on the chosen level of support from the motor controller. The so-called support levels, that is, how much the motor supported in addition to the driver's performance lie in horizontal drive 5-400 percent.

When the motors are regularly used heavily, especially when going uphill they may heat up significantly, some have a temperature sensor in the motor winding, where if a certain temperature is reached the electronics may reduce power to the motor. Ideally the electronics disconnect the battery at a predetermined discharge voltage to prevent total discharge and to ensure sufficient supply for the operation of the lighting system. This can be done by electronics in the battery.

Force control 
When running with a force sensor, the motor is automatically a certain percentage of the service provided to the driver. In many models, this proportion may be set in several stages. There are also models where the support level can be set only at the dealer to the customer.

Rotary motion detection 
In the version with speed sensor (s) of the motor is automatically using a function to a set percentage of the self-applied force. Since the force required at the speed rises sharply, it can be calculated in some models without force sensor.

Sliding or traction 
The slide or traction can help with Maximization of legislation to support a motor without pedaling to 6 km/h. The shift means has the advantage that you can let the bike roll along with motor support without pedaling or you push yourself (e.g. must, when transporting a heavy load, or so you walk up the wheel alone on a hill may be). For some models, the allowed 6 km/h can be achieved only in top gear, the other gears in the wheel rolls correspondingly slower. In any case, it allows for a faster (and more controlled physically) starting from standstill to "green" switches over light n

Power Electronics 
The power electronics, depending on the type of motor, consist of a DC motor controller with pulse-width modulation or a regulated DC-AC converter.

Motor types 

Almost exclusively, pedelecs use DC motors, using commutator-less and brush disc motors, which are suitable for direct drive, and brush motors with gears.

The use of maintenance-free AC induction motors pedelec is the exception.

A direct rotor hub motor may feature a regenerative brake, so it can be used as a brake that converts some of the kinetic energy into battery charge. In addition to charging the battery when braking this incurs less wear on the 
traditional brake, reducing braking noises.

Force approach of the electric drive 
See generally starting points of the electric drive. When Pedelec specifically, the type of control of the drive by the pedaling (see above), which may be integrated in the drive.

Drive positions 
The position of the motor has a significant impact on the handling of the pedelec. The following combinations of actuator position and motor have been successful:
 Motor in the bottom bracket (mid-engine layout)
 Motor in the hub of the front wheel
 Motor in the hub of the rear wheel

Range 
Generally the range with motor support is between 7 km for a constant rise and up to 70 km. At medium power addition, it is about 20 to 50 km. On some models, by default two successive switchable batteries are housed in luggage bags, here is the range specified at medium power addition of 100 km.

A conventional battery (36 V / 7 Ah) (1.9 to 5.1 kg mass in a pedelec) has an energy content of around 250 Wh (1 kg of gasoline has about 11,500 Wh). The conversion of electrical energy into mechanical work is done with some loss of energy due to the generation of heat. Typically, incurred losses are around 25 percent, depending on the efficiency of the motor and the motor controller. Thus, a pedelec with a 70 kg rider (total mass of ~100 kg) can be calculated to go about 5.6 kilometres on a 10% grade at 25 km/h on battery power alone (assuming Frontal area = 0.4 meter-squared, Drag coefficient = 0.7, Altitude = 100m, Wind speed = 10 km/h and Rolling resistance coefficient = 0.007).  Depending on the assistance of the rider (which is required on a pedelec), a proportionally greater range is possible.

Safety 
Safety issues are a concern in relatively flat areas, but are more pronounced in the hills. Hilly areas provide changing conditions; this poses the possibility of encountering more critical situations and thus more accidents may occur.   Cars may need to overtake pedelecs at higher speeds than cars would overtake regular bikes, and this may result in more accidents with serious consequences for both cyclists and drivers. For drivers and pedestrians, it may be difficult to estimate how fast a cyclist is moving. Also, an elderly on a pedelec may ride much faster than previously possible. Risky situations can also arise at exits and junctions. To illustrate the consequences of such critical situations, the German Insurers Accident Research (UDV) has conducted a research project with road tests, performance tests and crash tests for pedelecs.

On the other hand, many pedelec (and e-bike) users report that they can ride more defensively with the auxiliary electric drive assisting them; unlike traditional bicyclists that tend to be averse to braking since this incurs effort to accelerate again, a pedelec rider can brake and then accelerate back to a normal speed with much less effort. The Bavarian accident statistics for the first half of 2012 lists 6,186 accidents involving bicycles, of which 76 are e-bikes and notes that the accident risk of e-bikes is not higher than for other bicycles.

The use of S-Pedelecs involves an additional risk. Not only do they achieve a higher average speed, but a higher top speed (usually 45 km/h) and can also expect a higher annual mileage.

See also 
Motorized bicycle
eROCKIT
Electric bicycle
Electric bicycle laws

References

Further reading 
Hannes Neupert: Das Powerbike. Moby Dick, 1996, .
Gunnar Fehlau, Peter Barzel: Das E-Bike: Die neuen Fahrräder mit elektrischer Antriebsunterstützung. Typen – Modelle – Komponenten. Delius Klasing, 2009, .
Alexander Jaeger: Aufsatz: Elektrofahrräder in Zeitschrift für Schadensrecht. 12/2011 (PDF 4.25 MB).

External links 

Pedelec vs Ebike
Electric Bikes on Robert Llewellyn's Fully Charged. (The first bike presented is a pedelec.)
Go Pedelec! – a European project with independent information
Go Pedelec! Manual, info at ExtraEnergy, an association with the aim of spreading human-powered/electric vehicles
e-motion electric bike, 3sat-science documentary in March 2013, video, YouTube (44 min)
Electric bike: a trip simulator to understand how far and how fast you can ride with your electric bike

Road transport
Cycle types
Electric bicycles
Green vehicles